The Razors Edge World Tour was a concert tour played by the hard rock band AC/DC, in support of their twelfth studio album The Razors Edge. This tour had 5 legs around the world lasting 12 months starting on 2 November 1990 in Worcester, Massachusetts, finishing on 16 November 1991 in Auckland, New Zealand.

Background
It was the only tour to feature drummer Chris Slade until the Rock or Bust World Tour. Williams, who was struck with a kidney infection was filled in by Paul Greg on bass for several concerts on the first North American leg.
 
During the tour, the hugely successful Live at Donington show was performed. A video of the show has been released on VHS, then on DVD and Blu-ray. By the end of the tour, the band had grossed over 17 million dollars.
 
On 18 January 1991, three fans were crushed at a show in Salt Lake City when they fell to the floor at the beginning of the concert and were stepped on by other concertgoers, prompting the band to stop playing early on. Audience members were asking the band to stop the concert when the band was continuing to perform. The incident has since been a sore spot for AC/DC's rhythm guitarist Malcolm Young, according to their VH1 Behind The Music special in which it is reported that he has since refused to talk about it.
 
King's X was the opening band for the tour's second North American leg and first European legs of the tour. L.A. Guns was the opening band for the third North American leg of the tour.

Reception
Greg Haymes from the Daily Gazette gave the performance at the Knickerbacker Arena a positive review, opening with the anticipation of metalheads who weren't disappointed as the show opened with the arena rattling, while the band performed at three different volumes. Haymes also noted that even if the band may seem anachronistic or cliched, he acknowledged the teaming of the band's members fit together perfectly, even with the simplicity of their songs.

Opening acts

Typical opening acts
 Love/Hate
 King's X
 L.A. Guns

Monsters of Rock opening acts
 Metallica
 Queensrÿche
 The Black Crowes
 Mötley Crüe
 Negazione
 Patrick Rondat
 Legion
 Tesla
 Pantera
 E.S.T.

Setlist
"Thunderstruck"
"Shoot To Thrill"
"Back in Black"
"Fire Your Guns"
"Sin City"
"Heatseeker"
"Who Made Who"
"Jailbreak"
"The Jack"
"The Razors Edge" or "Are You Ready"
"That's the Way I Wanna Rock 'n' Roll"
"Moneytalks"
"Hells Bells"
"High Voltage"
"You Shook Me All Night Long"
"Dirty Deeds Done Dirt Cheap"
"Whole Lotta Rosie"
"Let There Be Rock"
 
Encore
"Highway to Hell"
"T.N.T."
"For Those About to Rock (We Salute You)"

Tour dates

Personnel
Brian Johnson – lead vocals
Angus Young – lead guitar
Malcolm Young – rhythm guitar, backing vocals
Cliff Williams – bass, backing vocals
Chris Slade – drums
Additional musicians
Paul Greg – bass

Notes

References

Citations

Sources

AC/DC concert tours
1990 concert tours
1991 concert tours